Carl Benjamin Boyer (November 3, 1906 – April 26, 1976) was an American historian of sciences, and especially mathematics. Novelist David Foster Wallace called him the "Gibbon of math history". It has been written that he was one of few historians of mathematics of his time to "keep open links with contemporary history of science."

Life and career
Boyer was valedictorian of his high school class.  He received a B.A. from Columbia College in 1928 and an M.A. in 1929. He received his Ph.D. in Mathematics from Columbia University in 1939. He was a full professor of Mathematics at the City University of New York's Brooklyn College from 1952 until his death, although he had begun tutoring and teaching at Brooklyn College in 1928.

Along with Carolyn Eisele of CUNY's Hunter College; C. Doris Hellman of the Pratt Institute, and later CUNY's Queens College;  and Lynn Thorndike of Columbia University, Boyer was instrumental in the 1953 founding of the Metropolitan New York Section of the History of Science Society.

In 1954, Boyer was the recipient of a Guggenheim Fellowship to further his work in the history of science. In particular, the grant made reference to "the history of the theory of the rainbow".

Boyer wrote the books The History of the Calculus and Its Conceptual Development (1959), originally published as The Concepts of the Calculus (1939), History of Analytic Geometry (1956), The Rainbow: From Myth to Mathematics (1959), and A History of Mathematics (1968). He served as book-review editor of Scripta Mathematica.

Boyer died of a heart attack in New York City in 1976.

In 1978, Boyer's widow, the former Marjorie Duncan Nice, a professor of history, established the Carl B. Boyer Memorial Prize, to be awarded annually to a Columbia University undergraduate for the best essay on a scientific or mathematical topic.

References
Notes

Further reading
Boyer, Carl B. (August 30–September 6, 1950). Lecture: "The Foremost Textbook of Modern Times." International Congress of Mathematicians, Cambridge, Massachusetts. Retrieved on 2009-02-20.
Boyer, Carl B. (1949). The history of the calculus and its conceptual development Hafner Publishing Company, New York, ed. Dover 1959. Retrieved on 2010-03-30.

External links

1906 births
1976 deaths
20th-century American mathematicians
American historians of mathematics
20th-century American historians
20th-century American male writers
Columbia College (New York) alumni
Columbia Graduate School of Arts and Sciences alumni
Brooklyn College faculty
American male non-fiction writers
Educators from Pennsylvania
People from Lehigh County, Pennsylvania
Writers from Pennsylvania